Modula-2+ is a programming language descended from the Modula-2 language. It was developed at DEC Systems Research Center (SRC) and Acorn Computers Ltd Research Centre in Palo Alto, California. Modula-2+ is Modula-2 with exceptions and threads. The group which developed the language was led by P. Rovner in 1984.

Main differences with Modula-2:

Concurrency; different than the concept of coroutine, which was already part of Modula-2
Exception handling
Garbage collection

Implementations
Modula-2+ was used to develop Topaz, an operating system for the SRC DEC Firefly shared memory asymmetric multiprocessing workstation. Most Topaz applications were written in Modula-2+, which grew along with the development of the system. Also to build a programming integrated development environment for it in the Acorn Research Center (ARC). Modula-2+ strongly influenced other languages such as Modula-3, but as of 2005, it had disappeared.

The original developers of Modula-2+ were both acquired: Acorn by Olivetti and Digital Equipment Corporation by Compaq. Compaq was bought by Hewlett-Packard. Olivetti sold the Olivetti Research Center and Olivetti Software Technology Laboratory (after bought Acorn ARC) to Oracle Corporation and was later absorbed by AT&T. DEC have made the SRC-reports available to the public.

See also
 Modula

References

Modula programming language family
Procedural programming languages
Systems programming languages
Programming languages created in 1984